Isaiah Jamal Briscoe (born April 13, 1996) is an American professional basketball player who last played for the Iowa Wolves of the NBA G League. He was ranked among the top point guards in the national class of 2015 by Rivals.com, Scout.com and ESPN. He completed his senior year at Roselle Catholic High School in 2015, and then played two seasons of college basketball for the Kentucky Wildcats.

Early life and high school career

Briscoe was born in Newark, New Jersey. He grew up in Newark until his later years when he moved to Union, New Jersey. His father, George Briscoe, is a hall of famer and former guard at Stockton State College, his sister, Iasia Hemingway, played at Syracuse University and his cousin, Kyrie Irving, is an NBA player. When he was in seventh grade, he was not selected to an elite AAU team, which fueled his determination. After his eighth-grade year at Kawameeh Middle School in Union, Briscoe repeated the grade at Good Shepherd Academy in Irvington. He was invited to the LeBron James Skills Academy. Briscoe played well, using his body to get to the rim, he was advanced physically for his age. Briscoe was one of only three players from the 2015 class to be invited. After the eighth grade, He attended Saint Benedict's Preparatory School. He teamed with current Fenerbahçe Basketball point guard, Tyler Ennis, to lead the Gray Bees to the brink of an ESPN National High School Invitational championship. They lost on a last-second 3-pointer to Montverde Academy, 67–65. Briscoe had 11 points in the game. Isaiah averaged 15.1 points, 4.6 assists, 3.5 rebounds and 2.3 steals his sophomore season for the 32–2 Gray Bees. Briscoe transferred to Roselle Catholic High School for his junior year, where he was coached by Dave Boff. He led the team to state titles in 2014 and 2015, scoring 27 points in his final high school game to lead Roselle Catholic to a win in the state's overall Tournament of Champions. As a senior, Briscoe averaged 21 points, five rebounds and three assists per game. He models his game after Deron Williams and Tyreke Evans. Prior to his senior year, Briscoe led the AAU New Jersey Playaz to the championship at the 2014 Nike Peach Jam in South Carolina. He posted averages of 19.2 points and 5 assists over 23 total games in the Nike Elite Youth Basketball League (EYBL) in 2014. Isaiah finished as Rivals.com #10 nationally ranked player and the #1 point guard in the class of 2015.

He committed to Kentucky on November 13, 2014, live on ESPNU, becoming the third highest ranked point guard that John Calipari signed at the school. "(UK) puts me in the best position to play basketball after college," Briscoe said. "Calipari puts you on the highest stage. The last couple years, all his point guards have been in the NBA. I'm just trying to be the next one." He chose Kentucky over St. John's. He was the nation's consensus top point guard, was ranked No. 13 overall player by ESPN and Scout, No. 10 by Rivals, and No. 12 by 24/7 Sports recruiting services. He helped lead Team USA at the 2014 FIBA Americans U18 Championships to a gold medal. He was a first-team Parade All-American in 2015. He was a McDonald's All-American Game, Jordan Brand Classic, and Nike Hoop Summit game selection.

College career
As a freshman, Briscoe averaged 9.6 points and 5.3 rebounds per game. However, he struggled with his shooting particularly from outside, hitting only 14 percent of his attempts from behind the arc. Coming into his sophomore season, he worked as playing more of a point guard role. He posted 12.1 points, 5.4 rebounds, and 4.2 assists per game as a sophomore.

At the conclusion of his sophomore season, Briscoe announced that he would forgo his final two years of collegiate eligibility and enter the 2017 NBA draft, becoming the fourth Kentucky Wildcat to do so.

Professional career

Kalev/Cramo (2017–2018)
After going undrafted in the 2017 NBA draft, Briscoe joined the Philadelphia 76ers for the 2017 NBA Summer League. In six games for the 76ers, he averaged 5.5 points and 2.2 assists per game. On September 14, 2017, he signed a training camp contract with the Portland Trail Blazers. He was waived by the Trail Blazers on October 13, 2017 after appearing in six preseason games. Briscoe signed with Estonian club Kalev/Cramo. On February 16, 2018 Briscoe scored 50 points as he took home MVP honors at the Estonia/Latvia All Star Game. On June 9, 2018, Briscoe won the VTB United League Young Player of the Year award, given to the league's best player under age 23. In the 2017–18 season Briscoe averaged 18.5 points, 3.4 rebounds, 4.2 assists, and 1.6 steals in 26.7 minutes per game.

Orlando Magic (2018–2019)
On July 6, 2018, Briscoe signed with the Orlando Magic. He made his NBA debut on October 19, 2018, recording 10 points and 3 assists off the bench in a 88–120 loss to the Charlotte Hornets. On April 4, 2019, Briscoe was waived by the Orlando Magic.

ratiopharm Ulm (2019–2020)
On October 25, 2019, ratiopharm Ulm of the Basketball Bundesliga (BBL) announced that Briscoe had signed with them. He averaged 7.6 points, 2.6 rebounds and 2.1 assists per game for the team.

King Szczecin (2020)
On February 1, 2020, he has signed with King Szczecin of the PLK. He played in three games for the team (averaging 15.7 points, 3.0 rebounds and 3.3 assists per game) before the season was shortened due to COVID-19 outbreak.

Iowa Wolves (2021–2022)
On October 26, 2021, Briscoe signed with the Iowa Wolves.

Career statistics

NBA

Regular season

|-
| align="left" | 
| align="left" | Orlando
| 39 || 0 || 14.3 || .399 || .324 || .577 || 1.9 || 2.2 || .3 || .1 || 3.5
|-class="sortbottom"
| align="center" colspan="2"| Career
| 39 || 0 || 14.3 || .399 || .324 || .577 || 1.9 || 2.2 || .3 || .1 || 3.5

College

|-
| style="text-align:left;"| 2015–16
| style="text-align:left;"| Kentucky
| 34 || 33 || 32.2 || .439 || .135 || .460 || 5.3 || 3.1 || 1.0 || .1 || 9.6
|-
| style="text-align:left;"| 2016–17
| style="text-align:left;"| Kentucky
| 36 || 36 || 30.4 || .470 || .288 || .635 || 5.4 || 4.2 || .8 || .2 || 12.1
|- class="sortbottom"
| style="text-align:center;" colspan="2"| Career
| 70 || 69 || 31.3 || .455 || .229 || .555 || 5.4 || 3.7 || .9 || .2 || 10.9

References

External links

Kentucky Wildcats bio
NBADraft.net profile

1996 births
Living people
21st-century African-American sportspeople
African-American basketball players
American expatriate basketball people in Estonia
American expatriate basketball people in Poland
American men's 3x3 basketball players
American men's basketball players
Basketball players from Newark, New Jersey
BC Kalev/Cramo players
Big3 players
Iowa Wolves players
Kentucky Wildcats men's basketball players
Korvpalli Meistriliiga players
Lakeland Magic players
McDonald's High School All-Americans
Orlando Magic players
Parade High School All-Americans (boys' basketball)
People from Union Township, Union County, New Jersey
Point guards
Roselle Catholic High School alumni
St. Benedict's Preparatory School alumni
Sportspeople from Union County, New Jersey
Undrafted National Basketball Association players